Leptobacterium is a Gram-negative, obligately aerobic and non-motile genus of bacteria from the family of Flavobacteriaceae with one known species (Leptobacterium flavescens).

References

Flavobacteria
Bacteria genera
Monotypic bacteria genera
Taxa described in 2009